The Women's shot put event at the 2013 European Athletics U23 Championships was held in Tampere, Finland, at Ratina Stadium on 12 July.

Medalists

Results

Final
12 July 2013

Qualifications
Qualified: qualifying perf. 16.00 (Q) or 12 best performers (q) advance to the Final

Summary

Details

Group A
12 July 2013 / 11:30

Group B
12 July 2013 / 11:30

Participation
According to an unofficial count, 18 athletes from 12 countries participated in the event.

References

Shot put
Shot put at the European Athletics U23 Championships